Astir may refer to:

Bautek Astir, a German hang glider
Grob G102 Astir, a German glider
Grob G104 Speed Astir, a German glider
Grob G103 Twin Astir, a German glider
Grob Astir CS77, a German glider
Grob G 118 Twin Astir II, a German glider